La banda del Golden Rocket (English: The Golden Rocket band) was a 1991 Argentine TV series.

Premise
The main characters were Diego, Adrián and Fabian, three distant cousins who dd not know each other, until they received a common heritage from their grandfather: an old '57 yellow Oldsmobile Golden Rocket 88, dubbed as the "Golden Rocket". The three cousins began the work of maintaining the car, and had romantic affairs.

Impact on the actors
Although the main characters are named after the actors playing them (Diego Torres, Adrián Suar and Fabián Vena), they were not starring as themselves; in fact, they were novice actors by then. Even so, Diego Torres had some roles as a singer within the plot, and became a successful professional singer after the ending of the series. Similarly, the character Adrián had a romance within the series with "Pato", a character played by Araceli Gonzalez. Suar and González had a real romance afterwards, and got married.

Torres, Suar and Vena reunited in 2011 for some episodes of Los únicos. They did not play again their former characters, Suar and Vena were already recurring guest actors, and Torres was invited as well. Nevertheless, they made metafictional references to the old series, mainly the use of a similar car. The car, however, is not the same physical car used twenty years before, but a similar one, as the owner refused to give or rent the car.

Cast

References

External links
 

Argentine comedy television series
1990s teen drama television series
1991 Argentine television series debuts
1993 Argentine television series endings
1990s Argentine television series
Television shows set in Buenos Aires